The  is a type of 2-6-0 steam locomotive built in Japan from 1929 to 1933. A total of 154 Class C50 locomotives were built, with manufacturing shared by Kawasaki Heavy Industries, Kisha Seizo, Nippon Sharyo, Hitachi, and Mitsubishi. They were designed by Hideo Shima .

Five were supplied to the Taiwan Government Railway, where they were classified class CT230.

Preserved examples
, six Class C50 locomotives have been preserved in Japan, as follows.

 C50 75: Preserved in Kitashikahama Transport Park in Adachi, Tokyo
 C50 96: Preserved in Koishikawa Park in Yaizu, Shizuoka
 C50 103: Preserved at the Minamisoma Museum in Minamisoma, Fukushima
 C50 123: Preserved in Station East Park in Oyama, Tochigi
 C50 125: Preserved in Station South Park in Yanai, Yamaguchi
 C50 154: Preserved in Kannonzan Park in Kameyama, Mie

See also
 Japan Railways locomotive numbering and classification
JGR Class 8620
JNR Class C56

References

1067 mm gauge locomotives of Japan
Steam locomotives of Japan
Steam locomotives of Taiwan
2-6-0 locomotives
Hitachi locomotives
Kawasaki locomotives
Preserved steam locomotives of Japan
Railway locomotives introduced in 1929